Biljana Stanković (Serbian Cyrillic: Биљана Станковић; born 11 September 1974 in Vršac, SFR Yugoslavia) is a Serbian basketball coach and former Serbian and Yugoslavian basketball player. She played at the point guard position and is a former member of national team of Serbia.

Professional career
Stanković is the most victorious female player in Serbian basketball history, winning 24 titles in 28 seasons from 1990 to 2017.

National team career
Stanković played over 100 games for the Serbian national team and was the team's captain for 7 years. She participated in three EuroBasket tournaments and one FIBA World Cup.

Coaching career
In December 2018, Stanković was hired as the head coach of Úrvalsdeild kvenna club Skallagrímur, replacing recently fired Ari Gunnarsson.

Honours
Hemofarm
 First League of FR Yugoslavia / Serbia and Montenegro (6): 1998, 1999, 2000, 2001, 2005, 2006
 Cup of FR Yugoslavia / Serbia and Montenegro (6): 1996, 1998, 1999, 2002, 2005, 2006
 First League of Serbia (3): 2007, 2008, 2009
 Cup of Serbia (5): 2007, 2008, 2009, 2010, 2012

Partizan
 First League of Serbia (1): 2013
 Cup of Serbia (1): 2013
 Adriatic League Women (1): 2013

Radivoj Korać
 First League of Serbia (1): 2014
 Cup of Serbia (1): 2014
 Adriatic League Women (1): 2014

References

External links
 Profile at eurobasket.com

1974 births
Living people
People from Vršac
Yugoslav women's basketball players
Serbian women's basketball players
Point guards
ŽKK Vršac players
ŽKK Partizan players
ŽKK Radivoj Korać players
Serbian women's basketball coaches
Serbian expatriate basketball people in Russia
Serbian expatriate basketball people in Romania
Skallagrímur women's basketball coaches
Úrvalsdeild kvenna basketball coaches